Sonu Kakkar is an Indian playback singer, songwriter and television personality. She is the elder sister of Bollywood singers, Neha Kakkar and Tony Kakkar. Sonu Kakkar was born in Rishikesh on October 20, 1979 in Uttarakhand. One of her most popular songs is Madari which she performed in Coke Studio with Vishal Dadlani. It was composed by Clinton Cerejo. Sonu Kakkar's recent songs include 'Sun Baliye' sung by Gajendra Verma, Sonu Kakkar. The music video features Gajendra Verma And Apoorva Arora.

Television

Discography

Studio albums 
Madari (2012)
Aisi Bani (2013)

Singles

Playback singing

Hindi songs

Kannada songs

Telugu songs

Tamil songs

Marathi songs

Malayalam songs

Punjabi songs

Nepali songs

References

External links

 
 

Indian women playback singers
Indian women pop singers
21st-century Indian singers
Living people
Bollywood playback singers
Kannada playback singers
Tamil playback singers
People from Rishikesh
Actresses from Uttarakhand
21st-century Indian women singers
Singers from Uttarakhand
Women musicians from Uttarakhand
Indian folk-pop singers
Year of birth missing (living people)